Karran Bayney (born 20 November 1956) is a Canadian former cricket umpire. He stood in four ODI games between 2009 and 2010 and eight Twenty20 Internationals in 2008.

See also
 List of One Day International cricket umpires
 List of Twenty20 International cricket umpires

References

1956 births
Living people
Canadian One Day International cricket umpires
Canadian Twenty20 International cricket umpires
Guyanese cricket umpires